Michel Rosales (born February 24, 1983) is a Mexican professional boxer. He competes in the Welterweight division.

Professional career
Rosales became the WBC Continental Americas Light Welterweight champion with a second-round TKO over Colombian Dario Esalas.
On April 11, 2009 he lost against top Welterweight contender, Canelo Álvarez.
In November 2009, Michel had his best win as a pro, beating Mark Jason Melligen over ten rounds.
On March 19, 2011 he will face David Lopez in a WBA light middleweight title eliminator.

Boxing record

References

External links

Boxers from San Luis Potosí
People from San Luis Potosí City
Light-welterweight boxers
1983 births
Living people
Mexican male boxers